La Procesión is a 1960 Argentine film directed by Francis Lauric. It was entered into the 1960 Cannes Film Festival.

Cast 
Guillermo Brizuela Méndez		
Héctor Calcaño	
Rafael Carret		
Carlos Enríquez		
Gloria Ferrandiz		
Santiago Gómez Cou		
José María Gutiérrez
José Maurer

References

External links 

1960 films
Argentine drama films
1960s Spanish-language films
1960s Argentine films